Bengal School of Technology, or (BST), is a NAAC and NBA accredited private pharmacy college located in Chinsurah, Hooghly district, India. It was founded in 2006. It obtained 1st phase NAAC accreditation in 2017 with grade B and NBA accreditation for B.Pharm course in 2019. The institute is affiliated to West Bengal University of Technology and all courses are approved by PCI & AICTE.

See also

References

External links 
 

Colleges affiliated to West Bengal University of Technology
Pharmacy schools in India
Universities and colleges in Hooghly district
Educational institutions established in 2006
2006 establishments in West Bengal